"There's a Long, Long Trail" is a popular song of World War I.  The lyrics were by Stoddard King (1889–1933) and the music by Alonzo "Zo" Elliott, both seniors at Yale.
It was published in London in 1914, but a December, 1913 copyright (which, like all American works made before 1923, has since expired) for the music is claimed by Zo Elliott.

In Elliott's own words to Marc Drogin shortly before his death in 1964, he created the music as an idle pursuit one day in his dorm room at Yale in 1913.  King walked in, liked the music and suggested a first line.  Elliott sang out the second, and so they went through the lyrics.  And they performed it—with trepidation—before the fraternity that evening.  The interview was published as an article in the New Haven Register and later reprinted in Yankee magazine.  It then appeared on page 103 of The Best of Yankee Magazine   In the interview, he recalled the day and the odd circumstances that led to the creation of this historic song.

Lyrics
THERE'S A LONG, LONG TRAIL

(From the 1914 sheet music)

Recordings
  James Reed and James F. Harrison (single) 1915
  George W. Ballard (Edison Diamond Disk) 1916
  John McCormack (single) 1917, mp3 and lyrics at 
  Oscar Seagle, with the Columbia Stellar Quartette, Nov. 14, 1917, audio at  
  Frank Sinatra and Bing Crosby sang it as a duet on radio in the 1950s.
  New Victory Band on One More Dance and Then (1978) as "Long, Long Trail"
 Roberts and Barrand on A Present from the Gentlemen (1992) as "Long, Long Tail" in "Great War Trilogy"
 Friends of Fiddler's Green on The Road to Mandalay (1994) as "The Long, Long, Trail"
 Sons of the Pioneers 1941
 Harp and a monkey recorded a version called 'Long, long Trail' on their 2016 'War Stories' album using the choruses and melody from the original song. The verses used a spoken word story by a woman from Rochdale recounting the story of her father being wounded in World War I.

Film
  There's a Long, Long Trail (1926) by H. Brian White. Black and white animated cartoon.
 Smilin' Through (1941). Sung by Jeanette MacDonald with a male chorus.
 Random Harvest (1942). Among the songs sung by a crowd celebrating the war's end early in the film
  For Me and My Gal (1942). Sung by The King's Men.
  Thirty Seconds Over Tokyo (1944). Sung by officers and guests in Goodbye Dance scene.
  Dumb Patrol (1964). Music over opening titles in this Bugs Bunny short.
  Oh What A Lovely War (1969) by Richard Attenborough.
  Escape from Tomorrow (2013) chorus sung by Roy Abramsohn.

Television
 Schroeder performs the song on piano for Snoopy in It's the Great Pumpkin, Charlie Brown.
 Charlie Brown and his fellow summer campers sing the song around the campfire in It Was a Short Summer, Charlie Brown as the scene dissolves into the next morning's reveille.
 In M*A*S*H, Colonel Potter, Hawkeye, and B.J. sing a chorus in harmony near the end of the season four  episode "Change of Command".
 Students at Bamfylde School sing the song in To Serve Them All My Days.
 Jack Ford (James Bolam) and Matt Headley (Malcolm Terris) get drunk and sing this together in an episode of When The Boat Comes In.
 Fictional character Jason Walton performs a portion of the song in The Waltons episode "The Hero".
 In an episode of The Lucy Show, Lucy and Viv sing the first two lines of the chorus in a failed attempt to entertain their children after the TV set breaks down.
 In episode five of The Crimson Field the VADs (Flora Marshall, Rosalie Berwick and Kitty Trevelyan) perform this song together at a concert organised by Flora.
 In "Death & Histeria", Season 3, Episode 5 of Miss Fisher's Murder Mysteries, Phryne Fisher (Essie Davis), Cec (Anthony Sharpe) and Dr. Samuels (Philip Quast) perform the song for Aunt Prudence (Miriam Margolyes).

Fiction
 In the 1934 novel The Postman Always Rings Twice by James M. Cain, the first two verses of the chorus are quoted at the beginning of Chapter 7. ( (pbk.), p. 39).
 In author Russell Kirk's short story "There's a Long, Long Trail A-Winding".
 In John Dos Passos's novel, 1919, the lyric is featured in Newsreel XXII.
 In R.C. Sheriffs play, Journeys End, the song is sung in Act 3, Scene 3.
 Though not mentioned by name, the song is sung in the Amelia Peabody book He Shall Thunder in the Sky; it is identifiable by the lyric mentioned “long, long time of waiting”.

External links
 Note and audio at firstworldwar.com
 Sheet music for "There's a Long, Long Trail", M. Witmark & Sons, 1914.

Words of the chorus appear at the end of Anthony Powell's Dance to the Music of Time: Third Movement

References

1914 songs
Songs of World War I